Old Dongola (Old Nubian: ⲧⲩⲛⲅⲩⲗ, Tungul; , Dunqulā al-ʿAjūz) is a deserted town in what is now Northern State, Sudan, located on the east bank of the Nile opposite the Wadi Howar. An important city in medieval Nubia, and the departure point for caravans west to Darfur and Kordofan, from the fourth to the fourteenth century Old Dongola was the capital of the Makurian state. A Polish archaeological team has been excavating the town since 1964.

The urban center of the population moved downstream 80 km (50 miles) to the opposite side of the Nile during the nineteenth century, becoming the modern Dongola.

History

Foundation and heyday
 
The archaeological site encompassing Old Dongola has about 200 ha. Its southern part features a citadel and urban buildings, while in the north, splendid suburban residences have been uncovered. There are also cemeteries associated with subsequent phases of the town's functioning, including Islamic domed tombs.

Old Dongola was founded in the fifth century as a fortress. On the citadel, which was the royal residence, numerous palaces and public buildings were located. In the mid-sixth century with the arrival of Christianity it became the capital of Makuria, The town was further expanded, including the area outside the citadel. Several churches were built. These include, to use the names contemporary archeologists have given them, Building X and the Church with the Stone Pavement. These two structures were erected about 100 meters apart from the walled town centre, indicating that at this time the town already extended over the original walls of the fortress. Building X was soon replaced by the Old Church.

In the middle of the seventh century, the two main churches were destroyed, but rebuilt soon after. Building material was taken from the Old Church and used to repair the city walls. Archeologists believe this destruction is evidence of the First (642) and Second Battles of Dongola (652).

At the end of the seventh Century, the Church of the Granite Columns was erected over the Old Church. Adorned with 16 granite columns, each with richly decorated granite capitals, the Church of the Granite Columns perhaps was the cathedral of Old Dongola.

The city's heyday was in the ninth–eleventh centuries, but building activity lasted until the fourteenth century. The Church of the Stone Pavements was replaced with the Cruciform Church at this time. Other buildings in use in Old Dongola at this time include many other churches, at least two palaces, and a sizable monastery on its north side. Several houses were well equipped and had bath rooms and wall paintings.

The Book of Knowledge, a travelogue compiled by a Spanish monk soon after 1348, mentions that Genoese merchants had settled in Old Dongola; they may have penetrated there as a consequence of the commercial treaty of 1290 between Genoa and Egypt.

The Great Monastery of St Anthony 
About 1.5 km to the north-east of the citadel lies the so-called Kom H where the monastery was uncovered. According to the inscription it is dedicated to St Anthony the Great but the Monastery of the Holy Trinity is also referred to in literature. It was probably one of the first Christian building projects in Dongola. Archbishop of Dongola, Georgios, who died in 1113, was buried in one of the crypts in the church. The inscription on his funerary stela indicates that St Anthony the Great was the patron of the monastery. In the rich assemblage of texts in Greek, Coptic, and Old Nubian found in the archbishop's crypt, a dedication to the Holy Trinity also appears.

Approximately 100 compositions, dated to the eleventh–thirteenth century, were uncovered on the walls of the monastery buildings. Many of these paintings are unique, both from the artistic and iconographical point of view. They depicted Christ, Mary, the Apostles, scenes from the Old and New Testament, as well as dignitaries.

The Throne Hall

The monumental representative building interpreted as the Throne Hall of the Makurian kings is a massive defence-like building of 28 m by 18 m by 12 m situated on a rocky spur to the east from the fortress. It was built in the 9th century. The building had two stories; the height of the walls was 6.5 m on the ground floor and 3.5 m on the upper floor. In 1317 it was turned into a mosque, an event which is preserved in a foundation stela erected by Sayf al-Din Abdullah Barshambu. The ceremonial Throne Hall on the first floor was turned into a prayer room. The mosque remained in use until 1969, when the building was converted in a historic monument.

Decline
However, during the thirteenth and fourteenth centuries the town was in decline. It was attacked by Arabs several times. A surviving inscription erected in Old Dongola bears the date of 1317, is commonly understood to be the record of a military expedition sent by the Sultan of Egypt to place his nominee Abdullah, perhaps a Muslim Nubian, on the throne. The royal court left Dongola in 1364.

Under the Funj, Old Dongola became the capital of the Northern provinces. The French traveller  visited the city in 1699, and in his memoirs he described it as located on the slope of a sandy hill. His description of Old Dongola continues:
The houses are ill built, and the streets half deserted and fill'd with heaps of sand, occasion'd by floods from the mountains. The castle is in the very center of the town. It is large and spacious, but the fortifications are inconsiderable. It keeps in awe the Arabians, who are masters of the open country.
Intensive trade relations with the Far East, as well as Europe, continued in this period.

Islamic cemetery
A large Islamic cemetery with numerous qubbas, erected in the 17th century, testify to the importance of Old Dongola also in postmedieval times.

Polish archaeological expedition to Old Dongola 
Polish archaeological and conservation works in Dongola were initiated by Kazimierz Michałowski. The Polish Centre of Mediterranean Archaeology University of Warsaw has conducted research at the site since 1964, with the support of the Sudanese National Corporation for Antiquities and Museums. The first head of the expedition was architect Antoni Ostrasz. Later, Stefan Jakobielski and Włodzimierz Godlewski directed the works for 60 years. Since 2017, the "UMMA: Urban Metamorphosis of the community of a Medieval African capital city" project (ERC Starting Grant), headed by Artur Obłuski, studies the youngest layers of the site. In May 2021, archaeologists led by Prof. Artur Obłuski have announced the discovery of a new church's apse decorated with paintings describing two rows of colossal figures, as well as an attached wall and the nearby dome of a large tomb in Old Dongola, which might be a cathedral and the largest known church from medieval Nubia. Artur Obłuski reported: "The apse is about 9 meters deep. This means that the eastern part of the building has been preserved to the impressive height of three floors of a typical block of flats. And this gives a great chance that there are more paintings and inscriptions under our feet, just like in Faras". In February 2023, Polish Centre of Mediterranean Archaeology headed by Dr. Artur Obłuski announced the discovery of the Ancient Egyptian hieroglyphs inscribed on stone blocks and figural decorations  as elements from a Pharaonic temple.

Notes

See also 

 2021 in archaeology

References 
 Godlewski, W. Archaeological and architectural evidence of social change in 13th–17th century Dongola, Polish Archaeology in the Mediterranean 27/1 (2018), 617–643
 Godlewski, W., Dzierzbicka, D., Łajtar, A. (eds). Dongola 2015–2016. Fieldwork, conservation and site management (=PCMA Excavation Series 5). Warsaw: PCMA, WUW 2018
 Godlewski, W. and Dzierzbicka, D. (eds). Dongola 2012–2014. Fieldwork, conservation and site management (=PCMA Excavation Series 3). Warsaw: PCMA UW 2015
 Obłuski, A., Godlewski, W., Kołątaj, W., Medeksza, S., and Calaforra-Rzepka, C. The Mosque Building in Dongola. Conservation and revitalization project. Polish Archaeology in the Mediterranean, 22 (2013), 248–272.
 Martens-Czarnecka, M. The wall paintings from the Monastery on Kom H in Dongola (=Nubia 3; Dongola 3; PAM Monograph Series 3). Warsaw: PCMA; Warsaw University Press 2011
 Jakobielski, S. and Scholz, P.O. (eds). Dongola-Studien: 35 Jahre polnischer Forschungen im Zentrum des makuritischen Reiches (=Bibliotheca Nubica et Aethiopica 7). Warsaw: ZAŚ PAN 2001
 Żurawski, B.The Monastery on Kom H in Old Dongola. The monks' graves. A preliminary report. Nubica, 4–5 (1999), 201–256

External links 

 Old Dongola – Polish archaeological expedition to Old Dongola
 Monastery on Kom H in Old Dongola - Virtual reconstruction

History of Nubia
Kingdom of Makuria
Archaeological sites in Sudan
Populated places in Northern (state)